CCI France Russie is a nonprofit association that represents and promotes economic interests of its Franco-Russian member companies. Today it brings together more than 400 French, Russian and other international companies from 40 sectors of the economy. The Franco-Russian Chamber of Commerce and Industry stands for tighter relations between France and Russia, for a constant dialogue between the two countries and for the development of common projects.

History 

CCI France Russie is present in Moscow since 1997 as the “Club France” Association. In 2006, the association joined the CCI France International group - the first network of French companies in the world, gathering more than 35,000 companies in 92 countries.

Activity 

Its work focuses on 3 key areas:
Building business community: organization and staging of sectoral committees, business presentations and B2B meetings, cultural events and regional delegations;
GR: consultations and dialogues with French and Russian private and public policy makers;
Supporting companies: support for Russian investments in France and for establishing foreign businesses in Russia, support for commercial development, business visa and work permit arrangement, outstaffing.

See also
 International Chamber of Commerce

External links 

International business organizations
International organizations based in Russia
Chambers of commerce
Organizations based in Moscow
1997 establishments in Russia